Exi or EXI has several meanings including:

 Exi (subculture)
 Excursion Inlet Seaplane Base, in Alaska, United States
 Efficient XML Interchange
 EXI Wireless
 Exillon Energy
 Toyota EX-I     
Exi: Youtuber famoso con más de 4 millones de suscriptores

See also 
 EXID – South-Korean girl group
 Exis (disambiguation)
 Exy – South Korean rapper, singer and songwriter